Obakino is a rural locality (a village) in Gorodetskoye Rural Settlement, Kichmengsko-Gorodetsky District, Vologda Oblast, Russia. The population was 49 as of 2002.

Geography 
Obakino is located 59 km northwest of Kichmengsky Gorodok (the district's administrative centre) by road. Gora is the nearest rural locality.

References 

Rural localities in Kichmengsko-Gorodetsky District